The DJ Kat show was a children's television programme presented by the puppet DJ Kat and his friend Linda de Mol, the sister of Endemol founder John de Mol, which ran from 1 September 1986 to 31 December 1995. The show was first broadcast to Europe on satellite and cable channel Sky Channel and later on Sky One and Sky Europe. The show was aired every weekday morning and afternoon (and in later years, at weekends), and throughout its life was home to a particularly large number of imported animated series. A separate version of The DJ Kat Show was later created for the United States where it was aired on stations affiliated with the Fox Broadcasting Company, including WNYW, Fox's flagship station. This article focuses primarily on the original European version.

History
The original European version was produced by John de Mol's production house John de Mol Produkties, which later became the world-famous Endemol. Linda de Mol is John de Mol's sister. All the linking material between the various cartoons was filmed in Hilversum, the Netherlands and written by Joost Timp.

DJ & Kat
DJ Kat was a puppet with a black leather jacket who loved spinning his records. He also liked to eat junk from the trash cans. His favorite dish was a jar of peas and carrots mashed together and his favorite drink was milk in a dirty glass. In the intro of the show DJ Kat would say the following line: "This is the DJ Kat show and I am DJ Kat...that's my name. It's a D and a J and a Kat with a K."
The reason it is spelled with a K is because the Dutch spell cat with a k and Linda de Mol is Dutch. DJ Kat was originally performed by puppeteer Robert 'Robbie' Hahn. DJ Kat often claimed to be on a project for Millhouse. The Millhouse character is never shown on the show.

British puppeteer Don Austen took over the character for a further 5 years (1989–95) for more than 2000 episodes on Sky One. The show picked up the PACE Satellite Award.

The Linda de Mol/Steffanie Pitt/Catrina Hylton-Hull years (1986–1992)

Linda de Mol was DJ Kat's side-kick when the series began in September 1986.  Later she would also branch out into German TV and hosted more of Endemol's programmes, including the original Dutch version of Deal or No Deal.

When Sky Channel decided to focus solely on broadcasting in the United Kingdom instead of Europe in early 1989, the production of the DJ Kat show moved from Hilversum to Blackbird Productions in London. Linda de Mol was unceremoniously dropped without much of an explanation. Her last episode (which was shot on location in Austria) was shown on Friday 3 February 1989.

The next Monday, 6 February, Steffanie Pitt (aka "Steffie"), daughter of Hammer Horror star Ingrid Pitt, introduced herself as Linda's replacement. Another puppet character, a scouse mouse called 'Yummy Tickle Mouse' was also added to the programme. Steffie left on 8 September of the same year, ostensibly to join the fictional all-female band 'The Sweet Potatoes'. At this time, Robbie Hahn handed over the DJ Kat puppet to British puppeteer Don Austen (who was already employed by Sky as Wally Blubb The Walrus on their Fun Factory weekend morning show).

Hahn swiftly rejoined Linda de Mol back in the Netherlands for the very similar TROS television programme De Billy Hotdog Show, the main differences being that the title character was a dog and the show broadcast only once a week.

Catrina Hylton-Hull (aka "Treen"), stepdaughter of the late Rod Hull of Emu fame, after numerous auditions, made her first appearance on 11 September 1989. The DJ Kat show did sketches around this time in an attempt to save the flagging format of the series.

Catrina Hylton-Hull lasted three years and proved quite popular with fans of the series initially, but with viewing figures falling Sky One came close to pulling the plug on the series. The acclaimed UK production/direction team of Patricia Mordecai, John Northover and Gale Claydon (who produced many series on ITV in the 1980s and 90s) were tasked with the job of creating a new look for the series, intended to begin in 1992. Catrina was initially contracted to continue as presenter with a "rotating" guest cast, but disagreements between her and the new production team about the direction of the new format saw her eventually opt to resign as presenter in mid-June 1992.

Second incarnation (1992–1995)

After Catrina Hylton-Hull left the show in 1992, the series was totally revamped, and an all-new studio set, theme tune and titles came into being. The revamped show aired for the first time on 13 July 1992 after a three-week gap (the show's cartoon line-up carried on as normal, but continuity was changed to a simple card reading "DJ Kat - on hols, back in ... weeks" at each advert break during this time).

The regular co-presenters of the show's second incarnation were - initially - West End actor Simon Jermond and singer Marcelle Duprey (also known as "Marcie"), with Joe Greco as a stand-in host. Jermond left the series in July 1993 after just one year, having decided that TV presenting was not for him, and Joe Greco replaced him on a full-time basis until the series ended in 1995. Alison Way, Peter Corey, David 'Saint' Rubin and future British soap star Jacqueline Pirie were also regularly featured as "guest stars" in various guises. New "game" slots (including 'Katz Alley' and 'Joke Machine') were also introduced for viewers to phone in and compete in, with prizes up for grabs.

The new format initially helped to revive the viewing figures with Don Austen, Joe Greco, and Marcelle Duprey continuing to perform through to 1995 with a now staggering output scriptwise. In September 1994, a Saturday spin-off show, 'KTV', was added to production, replacing Sky One's Fun Factory line-up. The new programme placed a greater emphasis on documentary-style features for kids and full-blown sketch parodies - most notably, the General Hospital spoof 'General Accident' and EastEnders take-off 'Arthur Square', both of which saw a then-unknown Jacqueline Pirie putting her acting talents (and flair for adopting English accents) to good use. A low-key Sunday DJ Kat Show was also eventually produced, featuring DJ Kat and usually just Joe Greco presenting.

Cancellation (1995)

By 1995, viewing figures had begun to fall once again, at which point series editor Michelle Kimber, writers Peter Corey and Dave Arthur, director John Northover and production team Patricia Mordecai, Michael Kerrigan and Gale Claydon reported that they all felt the series had now run its course; in August 1995 chief producers David Drewery and Paul Cole announced that they had decided against both revamping the format for a second time and re-commissioning the series, and Sky One announced that series would be cancelled at the end of the year.

John Northover has since cited that the main reason for the falling viewing figures was largely due to the fact that series writers had simply run out of ideas for new scripts and had begun recycling old ones.

The final episode was aired on 31 December 1995 and replaced in January 1996 by a short-lived new breakfast TV series, Boiled Egg & Soldiers, which struggled to gain a foothold.

American version
An American version of The DJ Kat Show debuted on WNYW in New York City on 28 November 1987. The series, which was set against the backdrop of a makeshift clubhouse in the basement of the television station, had the wisecracking cat puppet and his comedy assistant, Elizabeth Rose, reading viewers mail and engaging in comedy skits in between reruns of Woody Woodpecker and Looney Tunes movie cartoons.  DJ Kat always wanted to be "the star" and did everything to convince "the boss" (TV station owners) that he was the "biggest star" of the TV station.  Comic actor and puppeteer Jim Martin created the American version, manipulated, and voiced the "DJ Kat" character. Steve Howard was the producer who also contributed to the writing. The wrap-arounds were story-arc'd.  As time went on, the cartoons were edited to allow room for more live-action. Martin and Rose would leave the series and entertainer/songwriter/scriptwriter and puppeteer Craig Marin and comic actress and mimic Carmen De La Paz would succeed The previous pair as the series' second and last hosts/performers.

The DJ Kat Show was seen on Saturday mornings until Saturday 26 December 1987, shifting to a Sunday morning timeslot starting on 3 January 1988. The cartoons were dropped and the programs focused on stories that had DJ and "Jennifer Davis" (De La Paz) trying to host the show despite problems created by their stingy and mean boss "Mr. Midas G. Merkle" and other troublemakers.

The DJ Kat Show would remain on WNYW until 24 December 1988. DJ and the other Flexitoon puppets would be seen in wraparound segments during the station's weekday afternoon cartoon programming from then until March 1991 (around the time the Fox Kids Network launched on weekdays).

Sky One Undun
Sky One Undun was a children's television programme, which ran from 3 January 1996 to 18 October 1996. The show was first broadcast to Europe on satellite and cable channel Sky One.

Programmes 
Mighty Morphin Power Rangers 
Double Dragon

After DJ Kat ended, they modified the tombstone Sky One ident for a new kids block called Sky One Undun, which ran from 3 January 1996 to October 1996. It ended due to the majority of Sky's kids programmes moving to Fox Kids Network upon its launch on 19 October 1996.

Cartoons aired on the show
 Goober and the Ghost Chasers
 The Hot Rod Dogs And Cool Car Cats
 Harlem Globetrotters
 Hurricanes
 The Transformers
 Mighty Orbots
 Fireman Sam 
 Jem
 Scooby's All Star Laff-A-Lympics
 Sherlock Hound
 The World of David the Gnome
 Biker Mice From Mars 
 George of the Jungle
 James Bond Jr
 Felix the Cat 
 Paddington Bear
 Fraidy Cat
 Rude Dog and the Dweebs
 Count Duckula 
 Charlie Chalk 
 Hulk Hogan's Rock 'n' Wrestling  
 Dinosaucers  
 Help!... It's the Hair Bear Bunch!
 DuckTales
 Henry's Cat
 M.A.S.K.
 Alvin and the Chipmunks
 Teenage Mutant Ninja Turtles (UK Title: Teenage Mutant Hero Turtles)
 The Care Bears Family (UK Title: Care Bears)    
 Denver, the Last Dinosaur
 Inspector Gadget
 Heathcliff
 Dick Tracy
 Little Clowns of Happytown
 Dragon's Lair
 Dungeons and Dragons
 Diplodo
 Dastardly and Muttley in Their Flying Machines 
 Darkwing Duck
 The Adventures of Super Mario Bros. 3
 Ulysses 31
 Widget the World Watcher
 Robotix
 Top Cat
 Wheelie and the Chopper Bunch
 Journey to the Center of the Earth
 Roger Ramjet
 Hong Kong Phooey 
 Jayce and the Wheeled Warriors
 Far Out Space Nuts
 The Banana Splits Adventure Hour
 Postman Pat
 Saber Rider and the Star Sheriffs
 Sinbad Jr. and his Magic Belt
 Grimm's Fairy Tale Classics 
 Skippy the Bush Kangaroo   
 SuperTed
 Super Mario Bros. Super Show!
 Silverhawks
 Thundercats
 Samurai Pizza Cats
 Phantom 2040
 Superboy
 Pound Puppies
 Lensman
 Dr Splash
 BraveStarr
 He-Man and the Masters of the Universe
 She-Ra: Princess of Power
 G.I. Joe
 The World's Greatest Super Friends
 The Smurfs
 Little Wizards
 Yogi's Treasure Hunt 
 Wacky Races
 Wish Kid
 Dennis the Menace (1959) (UK Title: Dennis)
 Dennis the Menace (1986) (UK Title: Dennis)
 The Adventures of the Little Prince
 Bump in the Night
 VR Troopers
 Orson and Olivia
 Swat Kats
 Mighty Max
 The Adventures of Gulliver
 Mighty Morphin Power Rangers
 Amigo and Friends
 Dynamo Duck
 Teddy Trucks
 Incredible Dennis the Menace (UK Title: Incredible Dennis)
 My Little Pony
 Mrs. Pepper Pot
 The Incredible Hulk
 Superhuman Samurai Syber-Squad
 Delfy and His Friends
 Double Dragon
 Transformers: Generation 2 (UK Title: The New Transformers)
 Spider-Man
 Saban's Adventures of Peter Pan
 Wild West C.O.W.-Boys of Moo Mesa
 Highlander: The Animated Series
 Ritter's Cove

External links
 Retro Junk on the American version of The DJ Kat Show
 Flexitoon – pictures from The DJ Kat Show 

1986 American television series debuts
1995 American television series endings
1980s American children's television series
1990s American children's television series
1986 British television series debuts
1996 British television series endings
1980s British children's television series
1990s British children's television series
Television series by Endemol
American television series with live action and animation
British television series with live action and animation
Fox Broadcasting Company original programming
Sky UK original programming
American television shows featuring puppetry
British television shows featuring puppetry